Eutopia is a 2020 EP by British trip hop group Massive Attack, released on  on the band's YouTube account as a collection of three  music videos; as of  , it remains unavailable on Music streaming services. The EP represents the band's first work in four years, following the 2016 releases of the Ritual Spirit EP and the single "The Spoils".

Recorded during the early months of the COVID-19 pandemic, the three tracks feature spoken word passages from influential academics calling for action on climate change, tax havens and universal basic income.

Background 
During the spring of 2020, Robert "3D" Del Naja worked on a politically-themed audio-visual Massive Attack EP called “Eutopia”, consisting of three tracks created across five cities during the COVID-19 global lockdown period, with documentary filmmaker Mark Donne, AI Art pioneer Mario Klingemann and vocal collaborations with Algiers, Young Fathers and US poet Saul Williams. The spirit of the EP was inspired by Thomas More's 16th century book Utopia to address the need for global change amid COVID-19 pandemic.

Each of the tracks of Eutopia discusses a political issuethe climate crisis, tax havens, and universal basic incomeaccompanied with relevant commentary by public academics Christiana Figueres, Guy Standing, and Gabriel Zucman.

Professor Standing of the SOAS University of London said in an interview on the university website: "The collaboration began when Massive Attack contacted me after the pandemic hit, which was shortly after my new book came out in March. I think they had read or at least seen my earlier book, which is my analysis of the ethical and economic foundations of basic income."

Visuals 
The visuals for the music videos were co-written and co-produced by Robert Del Naja and documentary filmmaker Mark Donne, using artificial intelligence manipulated by Mario Klingemann. He has previously collaborated with Massive Attack and filmmaker Adam Curtis on the Mezzanine XXI show.

Track listing

Personnel

Massive Attack
Robert "3D" Del Naja
Additional musicians
Euan Dickinson – Sound Engineer
Algiers
Franklin James Fisher– vocals
Ryan Mahan– bass guitar
Lee Tesche– guitar
Matt Tong– drums
Saul Williams
Young Fathers
Kayus Bankole
'G' Hastings
Alloysious Massaquoi

Spoken word
Christiana Figueres
Guy Standing
Gabriel Zucman

Visuals
Robert Del Naja
Mark Donne
Mario Klingemann

References

2020 EPs
Collaborative albums
Concept albums
Massive Attack EPs
Self-released EPs
Political music albums by English artists
Climate change in music
Albums about the COVID-19 pandemic